Lardeh Shur (also Romanized as Lardeh Shūr and Lardehshūr) is a village in Oryad Rural District, in the Central District of Mahneshan County, Zanjan Province, Iran. At the 2006 census, its population was 184, in 44 families.

References 

Populated places in Mahneshan County